Mirabelle Thovex (born 24 August 1991 in Auray) is a French snowboarder. Thovex started snowboarding when she was 8 years old, and has been on the French national team since the age of 15. Thovex competed in the women’s halfpipe event at the 2010 Winter Olympics.

She is the sister of freestyle skier Candide Thovex.

References

External links
 
 
 
 
 

1991 births
Living people
People from Auray
Olympic snowboarders of France
French female snowboarders
Snowboarders at the 2010 Winter Olympics
Snowboarders at the 2014 Winter Olympics
Snowboarders at the 2018 Winter Olympics
Université Savoie-Mont Blanc alumni
Sportspeople from Morbihan
21st-century French women